A Thousand and One is a 2023 American drama film, written and directed by A.V. Rockwell. It stars Teyana Taylor, Will Catlett, Josiah Cross, Aven Courtney and Aaron Kingsley Adetola. It had its world premiere at the 2023 Sundance Film Festival on January 22, 2023 and won the grand jury prize. It is scheduled to be released on March 31, 2023, by Focus Features.

Cast
 Teyana Taylor as Inez de la Paz 
 Aaron Kingsley Adetola as Terry (6 years old)
 Aven Courtney as Terry (13 years old)
 Josiah Cross as Terry (17 years old)
 Will Catlett as Lucky
 Terri Abney as Kim Jones

Production
In December 2020, it was announced A.V. Rockwell would write and direct the film, with Lena Waithe set to serve as a producer under Hillman Grad Productions banner, and Focus Features set to distribute. In July 2021, Teyana Taylor joined the cast of the film.

Release
It had its world premiere at the 2023 Sundance Film Festival on January 22, 2023. The film is scheduled to be released on March 31, 2023, by Focus Features.

Reception 
 On Metacritic, it has a weighted average score of 71 out of 100, based on 9 critics, indicating "generally favorable reviews".

References

External links
 
 
 
 

2023 films
2023 drama films
American drama films
2023 directorial debut films
2023 independent films
Focus Features films
de:A Thousand and One